The National Hollerin' Contest, first held in 1969, is an annual competition held in Spivey's Corner, North Carolina.

The contest, formerly held on the third Saturday in June, was inaugurated to revive the almost-lost art of "hollerin'", a sophisticated vocal tradition that served as a means of long-distance communication between individuals as well as an amusing form of entertainment, before the widespread adoption of the telephone.  The proceeds from the event were, and continue to be, donated to the Spivey's Corner Volunteer Fire Department.

Contestants from the contest have appeared on The Tonight Show Starring Johnny Carson, The Late Show with David Letterman, and The Late Show with Stephen Colbert.

In 2013 the National Hollerin' Contest became part of the Hollerin' Heritage Festival.  The festival is held annually on the second Saturday in September on the property of the Spivey's Corner Volunteer Fire department. The 2016 Hollerin' contest was originally cancelled after 47 years. A man named Robby Goodman a former junior winner of the Hollerin' Contest has taken the cancelled event and turned it into something new to continue the tradition. It is now known as the World Wide Hollerin' Festival and will be held October 8 at Paradise Acres. Paradise Acres is a family owned catering service owned by Shane Taylor.

Notes

External links 
 National Hollerin'Contest: The National Hollerin' Contest Official Website 
 ibiblio: The National Hollerin' Contest
 ibiblio: The Lost Art of Hollerin' (with audio examples)
 NPR report: Audio Postcard: The National Hollerin' Contest (links to audio report)
 Catawba College: The Almost Lost Folk Art of Spivey’s Corner Hollerin’
 National Hollerin'Contest: 

Competitions in the United States